The Monument to Cuba is an instance of public art in Madrid, Spain, consisting of a fountain over which an sculptural group topped by an allegory of Cuba emerges from. It is located at El Retiro Park.

History and description
The idea dates back at least to 1928, and it was endorsed by Miguel Primo de Rivera. The Ayuntamiento de Madrid approved the erection of a monument in homage to Cuba in 1929. Works chiefly took place between 1929 and 1930, only missing the monumental fountain by 1930. The original project included a bronze sculpture of Cuban president Gerardo Machado, yet, following the delay in the inauguration of the monument, it was never added to the ensemble.

The leading element on top of the monument is a female allegory of Cuba, wearing a thinly draped tunic and a Phrygian cap, designed by Blay. The pedestal displays the supporting figures of Christopher Columbus (by Asorey), Isabella I of Castile (by Juan Cristóbal), as well as the coat of arms of Cuba. A bronze fore and an aft of a galleon, a work by Benlliure, also emerge from the sides of the pedestal. The ensemble is also ornamented by iguanas, tortoises and tropicals fruits made of bronze, also by Benlliure. The animals serve as water source of the surrounding fountain.

Following a long delay related to the political vicissitudes in both countries—including the renunciation of Primo de Rivera (1930), the proclamation of the Second Republic in Spain (1931) and the overthrow of Machado in Cuba (1933)—the monument was eventually unveiled more than two decades after its completion, on 27 October 1952, on the occasion for the 460th anniversary of the discovery of the island of Cuba during the first voyage of Columbus.

Bibliography
References

Bibliography
 
 
 
 
 

Sculptures by Mariano Benlliure
Fountains in Madrid
Monuments and memorials in Madrid
Stone sculptures in Spain
Bronze sculptures in Spain
Statues of Isabella I of Castile
Statues of Christopher Columbus
Outdoor sculptures in Madrid
Buen Retiro Park
Buildings and structures in Jerónimos neighborhood, Madrid